The Altazor Award of the National Arts or simply Altazor, is a Chilean award which is awarded annually.  The winners are chosen by the own creators and performers of the arts.  They were established in 1958, but were not awarded until 1999.  The award consists of a cast-iron sculpture created by sculptor Sergio Castillo and a diploma.  They were named in honor of Vicente Huidobro's work.

Institutions in the Altazor Awards
 Sociedad Chilena del Derecho de Autor
 Sociedad de Autores Nacionales de Teatro, Cine y Audiovisual
 Sociedad de Creadores de Imagen Fija
 Corporación de Actores de Chile
 Sociedad Chilena de Intérpretes
 Sociedad de Derechos Literarios

Nomination and award
The organizing committee invites all writers and artists to submit nominations for the different categories. The works, performances or productions candidates must have been released between December 1 of the previous year and November 30 of the same year.
The nominations, in accordance with the candidates are put to the vote by members of the respective awards college. The vote takes place in two rounds. Schools awards consist of authors and artists nominated convenor that societies have a minimum of 10 members by category. Members last 3 years in office may designate the societies that replace in whole or in part. Once installed, the schools may nominate award autonomously to a maximum of 20 new members. Altazor Award winners are permanent members of the respective school awards.

The College awards
Literary Arts College
College of Musical Arts
College Performing Arts Theatre
Performing Arts School of Dance
College of Visual Arts Awards
College of Media Arts award-Film
College of Media Arts award-TV

Ceremonies

Categories

Literary Arts
Narrative
Poetry
Essay

Visual arts
Painting
Sculpture
Engraving and Drawing
Installation art and Video art
Photography
Graphic design and Illustration

Performing Arts Theatre
Dramaturgy
Director
Actor
Actress

Performing Arts Dance
Choreography
Male Dancer
Female Dancer

Musical Arts
Classical music
Traditional music
Pop
Rock
Playing

Media Arts Film
Director - Film
Director - Documentary
Actor
Actress
Screenplay

Media Arts TV
Director - Drama
Director - TV Show
Actor
Actress
Screenplay

External links
Official site

Chilean awards